László Hunyadi or Ladislaus Hunyadi (Slovak: Ladislav Huňady; 1431 – 16 March 1457) was a Hungarian nobleman.

Ladislaus Hunyadi was the elder of the two sons of John Hunyadi, voivode of Transylvania and later regent of the Kingdom of Hungary, and Elizabeth Szilágyi. He was the older brother of Matthias Hunyadi, who would later become the king of Hungary. At a very early age he accompanied his father in his campaigns. After the Battle of Kosovo (1448) he was left for a time, as a hostage for his father, in the hands of George Brankovic (1427–1456), despot of Serbia. In 1452 he was a member of the deputation which went to Vienna to receive back the Hungarian king Ladislaus V. In 1453 he was already ban of Croatia and Dalmatia. At the diet of Buda (1455) he resigned all his dignities, because of the accusations of Ulrich II, Count of Celje, and other enemies of his house, but a reconciliation was ultimately patched together and he was betrothed to Maria, the daughter of the palatine, Ladislaus Garai.

After his father's death in 1456, he was declared by his enemy Ulrich II (now Captain General of Hungary with significant power) responsible for the debts allegedly owed by the elder Hunyadi to the state; but he defended himself so ably at the diet of Futak (October 1456) that Ulrich feigned a reconciliation, promising to protect the Hunyadis on condition that they first surrendered all the royal castles entrusted to them. A beginning was to be made with the fortress of Nándorfehérvár (now Belgrade, Serbia) of which Hunyadi was commandant. While admitting Ladislaus V and Ulrich, Hunyadi excluded their army of mercenaries. On the following morning (9 November 1456), Ulrich was killed by Hunyadi's men in unclear circumstances. Later Hunyadi served as master of the horse until his death.

The terrified young king thereupon pardoned Hunyadi, and at a subsequent interview with his mother at Temesvár swore that he would protect the whole family. As a pledge of his sincerity he appointed Hunyadi lord treasurer and captain-general of the kingdom. Suspecting no evil, Hunyadi accompanied the king to Buda.  But on arriving there he was arrested on a charge of plotting against the king, condemned to death without the observance of any legal formalities, and beheaded on 16 March 1457.

He is the protagonist of a popular Hungarian opera, Hunyadi László by Ferenc Erkel.

Ancestry

References

Sources

Acsády, Ignác (1904). History of the Hungarian Realm , vol. i., Budapest.
Engel, Pál (1996). Magyarország világi archontológiája, 1301–1457, I. ("Secular Archontology of Hungary, 1301–1457, Volume I"). História, MTA Történettudományi Intézete. Budapest. .
Kubinyi, András: Hunyadi Mátyás, a személyiség és a király, AETAS 22, 83–100, 2007.
Bánhegyi, Ferenc: A Hunyadiak dicsősége, Celldömölk, Apáczai Kiadó, 2008.

1431 births
1457 deaths
Ladislaus
Bans of Croatia
People executed by Hungary by decapitation
Executed Hungarian people
Masters of the horse (Kingdom of Hungary)